Tyloderma angustulum is a species of hidden snout weevil in the beetle family Curculionidae. It is found in the United States.

References

Further reading

 
 

Cryptorhynchinae
Beetles of the United States
Endemic fauna of the United States
Taxa named by Thomas Lincoln Casey Jr.
Beetles described in 1892
Articles created by Qbugbot